Cody Garbrandt (born July 7, 1991) is an American professional mixed martial artist who currently competes in the flyweight and bantamweight divisions of the Ultimate Fighting Championship (UFC). Garbrandt is a former UFC Bantamweight Champion.

Background
Garbrandt was born in Uhrichsville, Ohio, on July 7, 1991, and raised there mostly by his mother Jessica. Cody is ten months younger than his brother Zach, who he grew up constantly fighting. Garbrandt has claimed in several interviews that his drug addict father was never in the picture, spending most of his life in prison. Garbrandt's parents separated after a domestic abuse incident when Cody was one year old. Eventually, Cody was adopted by his mother's now ex-husband at the age of 10.

At the ages of four and five, Cody and Zach, respectively, had already been dabbling into boxing with their uncle Robert Meese who was an Olympic alternate in the sport. However, their mother was concerned about the boys becoming punch-drunk thus forbidding boxing and directing them towards wrestling.

At Claymont High School, Garbrandt competed in wrestling and football, winning a state championship as a freshman in 2007, by defeating Zach Neibert, 4–2, and was a runner-up in 2008. In football, Garbrandt won All–State honors as a linebacker during his junior season. After failing to claim the second state championship, Garbrandt became the NHSCA Sophomore National runner–up and subsequently stopped wrestling and convinced his mother to let him start training boxing seriously. Over about six years, Garbrandt compiled a 32–0 record as an amateur boxer.

Despite not competing in wrestling during his final two years of high school, Garbrandt competed at the national tournament as a senior and placed fifth, claiming All–American honors and receiving interest from several NCAA Division I schools, such as Penn State and Rutgers. He was then recruited by the Michigan State Spartans, but due to academic reasons, he ended up at Newberry College, a Division II school, before dropping out for academic and personal reasons, explaining;

After dropping out, Garbrandt sold marijuana, worked as a bouncer, and eventually completed coal miner training in order to work in the field familiar to his family. However, he decided to commit completely to his amateur MMA career, which was afoot after helping several MMA camps with wrestling.

Mixed martial arts career

Early career
Garbrandt ended up taking his first amateur bout in 2009 and compiled an amateur MMA record of 6–2 before making his professional debut in 2012. His pro record currently stands at 12–5, with ten of his opponents being finished via strikes. Prior to his finish of James Porter in May 2014, he moved from Ohio to Sacramento, California to train at Team Alpha Male in an attempt to further his career.

After a first-round finish of Charles Sanford in October 2014, he signed with the Ultimate Fighting Championship in the fall of 2014.

Ultimate Fighting Championship
Garbrandt made his promotional debut against Marcus Brimage on January 3, 2015, at UFC 182. He won the fight via TKO in the third round.

Garbrandt faced Henry Briones on July 11, 2015, at UFC 189. He won the fight by unanimous decision, going the distance for the first time in his professional career.

Garbrandt was expected to face long-time veteran John Lineker on February 21, 2016, at UFC Fight Night 83. However, Lineker pulled out of the fight during the week, after contracting Dengue Fever, and he was replaced by Augusto Mendes. Garbrandt won the fight via TKO in the first round.

Garbrandt faced fellow undefeated prospect Thomas Almeida on May 29, 2016, headlining UFC Fight Night 88. He won the fight by knockout in the first round and also earned a Performance of the Night bonus.

Garbrandt next faced Takeya Mizugaki on August 20, 2016, at UFC 202. He won the fight via TKO in the opening minute of the first round.

UFC Bantamweight Championship 
Garbrandt faced Dominick Cruz for the UFC Bantamweight Championship on December 30, 2016, at UFC 207. Garbrandt won the fight by unanimous decision after knocking Cruz down twice and nearly finishing him in the fourth round.

In January 2017, the UFC announced that Garbrandt would be one of the coaches on The Ultimate Fighter 25 opposite former UFC Bantamweight champion (and former Team Alpha Male teammate) T.J. Dillashaw, with the two expected to face each other on July 8, 2017, at UFC 213. However, the bout was scrapped on May 23, after Garbrandt sustained a back injury. The bout was rescheduled and eventually took place on November 4, 2017, at UFC 217. Despite knocking him down at the end of the first, Dillashaw rallied in the second round and defeated Garbrandt via technical knockout, marking his first loss in his professional career and losing the title.
Garbrandt then faced T.J. Dillashaw in a rematch for the UFC Bantamweight Championship on August 4, 2018, at UFC 227. He lost the fight via knockout in the first round.

Post UFC Championship
Garbrandt made his return against Pedro Munhoz on March 2, 2019 at UFC 235. In a frenetic and short bout, Garbrandt was knocked out in the first round. Both participants received the Fight of the Night bonus award.

Garbrandt was scheduled to face Raphael Assunção as the co-main event on March 28, 2020 at UFC on ESPN 8. However, Garbrandt pulled out of the fight on March 12 due to kidney problems. Instead the pair fought each other on June 6, 2020 at UFC 250. Garbrandt got back into the winning column in big fashion, winning the bout via one-punch knockout in the second round. This win earned him the Performance of the Night.

On August 7, 2020, it was announced that Garbrandt intended to move down a division (from bantamweight to flyweight) and was scheduled to face Deiveson Figueiredo for the UFC flyweight championship on November 21, 2020, at UFC 255. However, it was reported on October 2, 2020 that Garbrandt had to pull out of the contest. Garbrandt later revealed he tested positive for COVID-19 on August 29, 2020, as well as suffering from thrombosis, brain fog, and pneumonia.

Following his illness, Garbrandt returned at bantamweight and faced Rob Font on May 22, 2021 in the main event at UFC Fight Night: Font vs. Garbrandt. He lost the bout via unanimous decision.

Move to Flyweight
Garbrandt made his Flyweight debut against Kai Kara-France on December 11, 2021 at UFC 269. He lost the fight via TKO in the first round.

Return to Bantamweight
Garbrandt was scheduled to face Rani Yahya on July 9, 2022, at UFC on ESPN 39. However, Yahya withdrew in mid June due to a neck injury. The bout with Yahya was rescheduled and was expected to take place on October 1, 2022 at UFC Fight Night 211.  In turn, Yahya withdrew again in mid-September for unknown reasons. While seeking a new opponent, Garbrandt also suffered a training injury, pulling him from the card.

Garbrandt was scheduled to face Julio Arce on March 4, 2023 at UFC 285.  However, Arce withdrew in late January due to a knee injury. and he was replaced by Trevin Jones. He won the fight via unanimous decision.

Personal life

The Pact 
On May 8, 2018, Garbrandt's autobiography was published, titled The Pact. The book details his life, and explains his deep connection, and completed promise, with young Leukemia survivor Maddux Maple. The book also chronicles the story of Garbrandt's young life in the Appalachian region of Ohio and his early fight with drugs to the story of his reign as UFC Bantamweight Champion, and how he brought his friend Maddux Maple along with him for the whole journey to make good on their pact.

Family 
During Garbrandt's run with the MMA promotion Pinnacle FC, he met and began dating Danny Pimsanguan. The couple eventually married in July 2017. In October, the couple announced they were expecting their first child. In March 2018, the couple announced the birth of their son. Garbrandt announced in 2023 that he and his wife have divorced.

Championships and achievements

Mixed Martial Arts
Ultimate Fighting Championship
UFC Bantamweight Championship (One time; former)
Performance of the Night (Two times) 
Fight of the Night (Two times) vs. Dominick Cruz and Pedro Munhoz
MMAJunkie.com
2020 June Knockout of the Month vs. Raphael Assunção
Pundit Arena
2017 Fight of the Year vs. T.J. Dillashaw
MMADNA.nl
2016 Rising Star of the Year
World MMA Awards
2016 Breakthrough Fighter of the Year

Folkstyle wrestling
National High School Coaches Association
 NHSCA Sophomore National Runner-up out of Ohio (2008)
Ohio High School Athletic Association
OHSAA 112 lb DII State Champion out of Claymont High School (2007)
OHSAA 119 lb DII State Runner-up out of Claymont High School (2008)

Mixed martial arts record

|-
|Win
|align=center|13–5
|Trevin Jones
|Decision (unanimous)
|UFC 285
|
|align=center|3
|align=center|5:00
|Las Vegas, Nevada, United States
|
|-
|Loss
|align=center|12–5
|Kai Kara-France
|TKO (punches)
|UFC 269
|
|align=center|1
|align=center|3:21
|Las Vegas, Nevada, United States
|
|-
|Loss
|align=center|12–4
|Rob Font
|Decision (unanimous)
|UFC Fight Night: Font vs. Garbrandt
|
|align=center|5
|align=center|5:00
|Las Vegas, Nevada, United States
|
|-
|Win
|align=center|12–3
|Raphael Assunção
|KO (punch)
|UFC 250
|
|align=center|2
|align=center|4:59
|Las Vegas, Nevada, United States
|
|-
|Loss
|align=center|11–3
|Pedro Munhoz
|TKO (punches)
|UFC 235
|
|align=center|1
|align=center|4:51
|Las Vegas, Nevada, United States
|
|-
|Loss
|align=center|11–2
|T.J. Dillashaw
|KO (knee and punches)
|UFC 227 
|
|align=center|1
|align=center|4:10
|Los Angeles, California, United States
|
|-
|Loss
|align=center|11–1
|T.J. Dillashaw
|TKO (punches)
|UFC 217
|
|align=center|2
|align=center|2:41
|New York City, New York, United States
|
|-
|Win
|align=center|11–0
|Dominick Cruz
|Decision (unanimous)
|UFC 207
|
|align=center|5
|align=center|5:00
|Las Vegas, Nevada, United States
| 
|-
|Win
|align=center|10–0
|Takeya Mizugaki
|TKO (punches)
|UFC 202
|
|align=center|1
|align=center|0:48
|Las Vegas, Nevada, United States
|
|-.
|Win
|align=center|9–0
|Thomas Almeida
|KO (punches)
|UFC Fight Night: Almeida vs. Garbrandt
|
|align=center|1
|align=center|2:53
|Las Vegas, Nevada, United States
|
|-
|Win
|align=center|8–0
|Augusto Mendes
|KO (punches)
|UFC Fight Night: Cowboy vs. Cowboy
|
|align=center|1
|align=center|4:18
|Pittsburgh, Pennsylvania, United States
|
|-
|Win
|align=center|7–0
|Henry Briones
|Decision (unanimous)
|UFC 189
|
|align=center|3
|align=center|5:00
|Las Vegas, Nevada, United States
|
|-
|Win
|align=center|6–0
|Marcus Brimage
| TKO (punches)
|UFC 182
|
|align=center|3
|align=center|4:50
|Las Vegas, Nevada, United States
|
|-
|Win
|align=center|5–0
|Charles Stanford
|TKO (punches)
|NAAFS 8
|
|align=center|1
|align=center|1:37
|Canton, Ohio, United States
|
|-
|Win
|align=center|4–0
|James Porter
|TKO (punches)
|Pinnacle FC: Pittsburgh Challenge Series 7
|
|align=center|1
|align=center|2:17
|Pittsburgh, Pennsylvania, United States
|
|-
|Win
|align=center|3–0
|Dominic Mazzotta
|TKO (punches)
|Gladiators of the Cage 4
|
|align=center|2
|align=center|0:32
|Pittsburgh, Pennsylvania, United States
|
|-
|Win
|align=center| 2–0
|Shane Manley
|KO (punches)
|Pinnacle FC: Pittsburgh Challenge Series 5
|
|align=center|1
|align=center|3:57
|Canonsburg, Pennsylvania, United States
|
|-
|Win
|align=center| 1–0
|Charles Kessinger
|TKO (punches)
|Pinnacle FC: Pittsburgh Challenge Series 1
|
|align=center|1
|align=center|4:11
|Canonsburg, Pennsylvania, United States
|
|}

See also
 List of current UFC fighters
 Ultimate Fighting Championship Pound for Pound rankings

References

External links

1991 births
People from Uhrichsville, Ohio
Living people
Bantamweight mixed martial artists
American male mixed martial artists
Mixed martial artists utilizing collegiate wrestling
Mixed martial artists from Ohio
Ultimate Fighting Championship champions
Ultimate Fighting Championship male fighters
American male sport wrestlers
Amateur wrestlers